Eagle Place Services Ltd v Rudd [2010] IRLR 486 (EAT) is a UK labour law case, concerning disability discrimination.

Facts
Mr Rudd was a solicitor with detached retinas, and disabled within the meaning of the DDA 1995, working for law firm Nabarro as a senior associate, but employed by Eagle Place Services Ltd. Agreed adjustments to accommodate his disability were that some days he could work at home. This went well through a trial period. But eventually he was dismissed by the head of human resources, Ms Celia Staples, after he had allegedly asked for a raise to benefit from an insurance claim, threatened to sue for constructive dismissal otherwise and refused inspection of IT equipment at his house. The tribunal rejected Ms Celia Staples evidence as being unreliable, and found that on the contrary, the reason for dismissal was Nabarro was concerned about the cost of adjustments.

Nabarro appealed and contended the proper comparator was a lawyer of the same grade and skills who needed to work 2 days at home, and that such a person would not be dismissed. Running the “bastard defence”, Eagle Place Services acknowledged they acted unfairly but a hypothetical non-disabled comparator would have been treated no differently since, in large law firms, it was normal to manage dismissals by summarily dismissing highly paid employees, in the expectation that an amicable settlement would follow.

Judgment
Judge Serota QC dismissed Nabarro’s appeal and held that having made adjustments, it could not assert that it would dismiss a non-disabled comparator whose adjustments would create the same cost. The hypothetical comparator would not have been dismissed, following Malcolm v Lewisham LBC. Moreover it would have been unreasonable to dismiss such a person, and so there was discrimination.

Although unreasonable treatment in itself cannot give rise to an inference of discrimination, ‘where an employment tribunal has rejected an explanation on the part of the employer for what might be regarded as unreasonable behaviour it is perfectly proper for it to draw an inference of discrimination, assuming... there is other evidence pointing to discriminatory conduct.’

See also

UK labour law

Notes

References

Employment Appeal Tribunal cases
2009 in case law
2009 in British law